Lu Yunxiu (born 6 September 1996) is a Chinese windsurfer. She is the 2020 Olympic champion in Women's RS:X. The discipline is being retired from the Olympics, which also makes her the last Olympic champion in Women's RS:X.

Lu is from Zhangzhou, Fujian. She was born in 1996 in the city of Duxun. Since 2008, she specialized in track and field, but eventually switched to windsurfing and was selected by the Fujian Provincial Sailing and Windsurfing Center.

References

External links
 
 
 

1996 births
Living people
Chinese windsurfers
Female windsurfers
Chinese female sailors (sport)
Olympic sailors of China
Sailors at the 2020 Summer Olympics – RS:X
Medalists at the 2020 Summer Olympics
RS:X class world champions
21st-century Chinese women